The 1968 Prairie View A&M Panthers football team represented Prairie View A&M University as a member of the Southwestern Athletic Conference (SWAC) during the 1968 NCAA College Division football season. They were led by fourth-year head coach Hoover J. Wright and played their home games at Edward L. Blackshear Field in Prairie View, Texas. Prairie View A&M finished the season with an overall record of 4–6 and a mark of 2–5 in conference play, placing sixth in the SWAC.

Schedule

References

Prairie View AandM
Prairie View A&M Panthers football seasons
Prairie View AandM Panthers football